This is a list of the Danish Singles Chart number-one hits of 1996 from the International Federation of the Phonographic Industry and Nielsen Soundscan. They were provided through Billboard magazine under the "Hits of the World" section.

Chart history

See also
1996 in music

References

1996 in Denmark
1996 record charts
Lists of number-one songs in Denmark